Joanna Sawyer is a British born actress, singer and choreographer. 
About Sawyer's performance in Love Birds, Rachel Male of Black Diamond 107.8FM radio wrote, "Joanna Sawyer is not to be outshined….With her main musical number "Paint a Rainbow" adding a hint of burlesque style to the performance." Sawyer recently played the role of Rusty in the UK No.1 tour of Footloose.

Education
Sawyer is a graduate of the Guildford School of Acting with Distinction in Musical Theatre. Sawyer won the graduate musical theatre prize.

Theatre credits
 Love Birds originating the part of "Veronica" (The Pleasance, Edinburgh)
 The Sound of Music (Cairo, Egypt and Beirut, Lebanon tour)
 Jack and the Beanstalk playing "Jack Trott" (Key Theatre)
 The Importance of Being Earnest playing "Cecily Cardew" (English Theatre, Hamburg)
 Beauty and The Beast playing "Beauty" (Corn Exchange)
 West Side Story playing "Anita" (Belgrade Theatre).
 Cinderella playing "Cinderella" (Ashcroft Theatre – Fairfield Halls)
 Footloose playing "Rusty" (UK National Tour 2016)
Wicked Ensemble and understudy for "Glinda" (UK West End cast 2019)

Television
 Our Girl (BBC One, David Drury)

The Femmes
Sawyer is the co-founder of 1940s style, close harmony trio The Femmes, doubling as their choreographer. The Femmes have performed throughout the UK.

References

External links
 www.thefemmes.co.uk

Alumni of the Guildford School of Acting
English sopranos
English musical theatre actresses
English stage actresses
Living people
Actresses from Bristol
Year of birth missing (living people)